Graphium browni is a butterfly found in Oceania - New Britain, Duke of York Islands, New Hanover Island and St Matthias Islands - that belongs to the swallowtail family.

The larva feeds on Annona mercuriana.

Taxonomy
Graphium browni belongs to the wallacei species group. This clade has four members:
Graphium wallacei (Hewitson, 1858)
Graphium hicetaon (Mathew, 1886)
Graphium browni (Godman & Salvin, 1879)
Graphium sandawanum Yamamoto, 1977

References

D'Abrera, B. (1971). Butterflies of the Australian Region. Lansdowne Press, Melbourne.

External links
Globis.insects-online: images of Graphium browni

browni
Butterflies of Oceania
Endemic fauna of Papua New Guinea
Lepidoptera of Papua New Guinea
Fauna of New Britain
New Ireland Province
Butterflies described in 1879
Taxa named by Frederick DuCane Godman
Taxa named by Osbert Salvin